Pseudanthoecia is a genus of moths of the family Noctuidae.

Species
 Pseudanthoecia tumida (Grote, 1880)

References
Natural History Museum Lepidoptera genus database
Pseudanthoecia at funet

Cuculliinae